The women's 100 metres event at the 2019 African Games was held on 26 and 27 August in Rabat.

Medalists

Results

Heats
Qualification: First 3 in each heat (Q) and the next 6 fastest (q) advanced to the semifinals.

Wind:Heat 1: -0.1 m/s, Heat 2: -0.1 m/s, Heat 3: +0.2 m/s, Heat 4: +0.2 m/s, Heat 5: 0.0 m/s, Heat 6: -0.2 m/s

Semifinals
Qualification: First 2 in each semifinal (Q) and the next 2 fastest (q) advanced to the final.

Wind:Heat 1: -0.9 m/s, Heat 2: -1.1 m/s, Heat 3: -0.4 m/s

Final
Wind: -1.2 m/s

References

100
2019
2019 in women's athletics